Racinoa is a genus of moths of the family Bombycidae. The genus was erected by Thierry Bouyer in 2008.

Selected species
Racinoa albivertex (Strand, 1910)
Racinoa fuscocervina (Strand, 1910)
Racinoa ianthe (Druce, 1887)
Racinoa leucoides (Strand, 1910)
Racinoa maculifrons (Strand, 1910)
Racinoa metallescens (Möschler, 1887)
Racinoa obliquisigna (Hampson, 1910)
Racinoa ochraceipennis (Strand, 1910)
Racinoa pallicornis (Strand, 1910)
Racinoa signicosta (Strand, 1910)
Racinoa spiralis (Kühne, 2008)
Racinoa versicolora (Kühne, 2008)
Racinoa zolotuhini (Kühne, 2008)

References

Bombycidae